Kachka is a rural locality (a village) in Ust-Kachkinskoye Rural Settlement, Permsky District, Perm Krai, Russia. The population was 103 as of 2010. There are 19 streets.

Geography 
Kachka is located 48 km west of Perm (the district's administrative centre) by road. Krasny Voskhod is the nearest rural locality.

References 

Rural localities in Permsky District